The 2010 Brentwood council election took place on 6 May 2010 to elect members of Brentwood District Council in Essex, England as part of the 2010 United Kingdom local elections. One third of the council was up for election with the council previously having a majority for the Conservative party. The Conservative Party lost two seats to the Liberal Democrats in Brentwood North and Brentwood West respectively.

Prior to the election the composition of the council was:
Conservative 28
Liberal Democrat 6
Labour 2
Independent 1

Following the election the composition of the council is:
Conservative 27
Liberal Democrat 8
Labour 1
Independent 1

Composition of expiring seats before election

References

External links
 Brentwood Council

2010
2010 English local elections
May 2010 events in the United Kingdom
2010 Brentwood